Maxine Caulfield is a fictional character from the Life Is Strange video game series published by Square Enix. Created by French developer Dontnod Entertainment, she first appears in the 2015 video game Life Is Strange as the main protagonist. She is voiced by actress Hannah Telle. 

The character received a generally positive reception by video game publications, although some labeled her characterization as generic and inauthentic.

Character development 

In 2015's Life Is Strange, Max Caulfield is portrayed with the ability to rewind time to supplement the game's core gameplay mechanism. While the lead character rewinds time, visual effects such as post-processing, double exposure, and overlapping screen space particles were employed as an artistic approach to be portrayed. The character were created using well-known archetypes, initially to establish a player access point and subsequently to subvert them. The supernatural elements were developed as a metaphor for the character's inner turmoil in order to serve the realism, and specialists were engaged to tackle the subject of teen suicide.

Max's surname references Holden Caulfield from The Catcher in the Rye by J. D. Salinger, and his personality as an "iconic rebel" is echoed by Max's spirit of defiance and characterization as an outsider in her community. Max is "always looking to the past. She has this old camera, she's reluctant to make decisions. Christian Divine has been writing her [in a way that] sometimes she's using some older expressions," according to Michel Koch in a June 2015 interview with Polygon. Max was the second female protagonist in a Dontnod Entertainment title. Most prospective publishers were unwilling to publish a game unless it had a male protagonist, according to a developer journal provided by Dontnod. Most publishers objected to Dontnod's first project, a female protagonist in Remember Me. Oskar Guilbert, CEO of Dontnod, was similarly skeptical at first. Square Enix was the only publisher with no intention to change the female protagonist. Dontnod co-founder Jean-Maxime Moris has claimed that the gender equality in video games was "a great debate to have", but actually "we're not pretending to address the issue or use the issue to stand out from the rest."

It was decided that the majority of the funding would be spent on character writing and voice actors, such as Max. Christian Divine and Cano were then entrusted with fine-tuning it in English. In July 2014, Hannah Telle auditioned for Max Caulfield and was a cast; Ashly Burch auditioned for both Max and her assigned role, Chloe Price. The sessions took place in Los Angeles, California, with the French developer joining through Skype.

Appearances

In Life Is Strange 

Maxine "Max" Caulfield, is the main protagonist of the game, and is a twelfth-grade student attending Blackwell Academy during October 2013. During photography class with her teacher Mark Jefferson, Max experiences a vision of a lighthouse being destroyed by a swelling tornado. Leaving for the restroom to regain her composure, she witnesses classmate Nathan Prescott (Nik Shriner) kill a girl in a fit of rage. In a single, sudden effort, she develops the ability to rewind time and rescues the girl, revealed to be her best friend, Chloe Price. The two reunite and go for a walk at the lighthouse, where Max reveals to Chloe her capacity to travel back in time. It is established that the vision is rather the reckoning of a future event: a storm approaching the town. The next day, Max observes fellow student Kate Marsh being bullied for a viral video depicting her kissing several students at a party.

Meeting Chloe at the diner where her mother Joyce works, they decide to experiment with Max's power at Chloe's secret scrapyard hideout. However, strain causes Max to have a nosebleed and faint. Chloe takes her back to Blackwell, but class is halted when everyone is called out to the courtyard. Kate commits suicide by jumping off the roof of the girls' dorm. Max manages to rewind and time stops unexpectedly as she reaches Kate, giving Max the opportunity to convince her to come down. Max ultimately resolves to uncover what happened to Kate and Chloe's missing friend Rachel Amber. Max and Chloe break into the principal's office that night to investigate and enter the pool for a swim before evading David Madsen, head of security at Blackwell and Chloe's stepfather, and fleeing back to Chloe's place. The next morning, they sneak into the motorhome of Frank Bowers, drug dealer and friend of Rachel, and learn that Rachel was in a relationship with Frank and lied to Chloe about it, causing Chloe to storm off feeling betrayed. Max returns to her dormitory and examines a childhood photo of her and Chloe, but is suddenly transported to the day the picture was taken. Max prevents Chloe's father William from dying in a traffic collision, which inadvertently creates an alternative reality where William is alive but Chloe has been paralysed from the neck down as a result of a collision in her own car.

Max uses the photo to undo her decision and return to the present day, restoring Chloe's health. Continuing their investigation, Max and Chloe obtain clues leading them to an abandoned barn owned by the influential Prescott family. They discover a hidden bunker containing pictures of Kate and Rachel tied up and intoxicated, with Rachel being buried at Chloe's secret hideout. They hurry back to the scrapyard and find Rachel's grave, much to Chloe's despair. Max follows Chloe at the school party to confront Nathan, believing he will target fellow student Victoria Chase. They receive a text from Nathan threatening to destroy the evidence, returning them to the scrapyard. All of a sudden, the two are ambushed by Jefferson, who anaesthetises Max and kills Chloe with a shot to the head. Max is kidnapped and held captive in the "Dark Room", a place Jefferson has been drugging and photographing young girls to capture their innocence. Jefferson also reveals that he took Nathan on as a personal student, but killed him before abducting Max due to him giving Rachel an overdose when he tried to mimic Jefferson's work, and intends to do the same to Max after he has the photos he wants.  Max escapes into a photograph and emerges back at the beginning in Jefferson's class. She alerts David, getting Jefferson (and Nathan) arrested.

Max is given the opportunity to go to San Francisco and have one of her photos displayed in an art gallery. She calls Chloe from the event, realizing that, for all her effort, the storm has reached Arcadia Bay. Max travels back to the time at which she took the gallery photo, which eventually leads her to sojourn alternative realities as they devolve into a dreamscape nightmare. Max and Chloe finally return to the lighthouse and confront the fact that Max brought the storm into existence by saving Chloe from being shot by Nathan earlier in the week. The only way to prevent it is for Max to go back to that moment via a photo she took and allow Chloe to be killed by Nathan. Max must make a choice: sacrifice Chloe's life to save Arcadia Bay, or sacrifice Arcadia Bay to spare Chloe.

In Life Is Strange: Before the Storm DLC 
In the downloadable content bonus episode of Life Is Strange: Before the Storm (2017), "Farewell", a 13-year old Max Caulfield struggles to break the news to Chloe that her family is moving to Seattle in three days. The two find a recording of their 8-year old selves speaking of a buried treasure. After finding the map and an amulet in the attic, Max and Chloe discover the treasure's spot, only to find that Chloe's dad, William, had put their time capsule in a keg, along with his own recording, for safekeeping. Max can choose to either tell Chloe the truth or hide it; regardless of her decision, their plans for the rest of the day are cut short when Chloe's mother, Joyce, returns home with the news of William's death. Max attends William's funeral days later and leaves for Seattle with her parents immediately after, leaving Chloe in grief.

In Life Is Strange 2 
In Life Is Strange 2 (2018), Max is mentioned by David while he is talking to Sean Diaz, the main protagonist of the game, if Arcadia Bay was sacrificed in the first game. She is also seen in a photograph kept in David's trailer, which shows both her and Chloe sometime after 2013. During David's phone call with Chloe, it hints that she and Chloe either live in or visited New York and had a bad experience with a local, as David reminds Chloe that "New Yorkers are assholes". It is also implied that she and Chloe had visited him sometime ago.

In Life Is Strange: True Colors 
In the bonus chapter of Life Is Strange: True Colors (2021), "Wavelengths", Max is mentioned by Steph Gingrich, the story's main character, during a tabletop game with Mikey if Arcadia Bay was sacrificed in the first game. Steph only states that Chloe was gone without any contact with her and the only thing she heard about Chloe is that she's wandering around with another "weirdo" (who is actually Max).

In Life Is Strange Remastered Collection 
Max and Chloe reappeared in the Life Is Strange Remastered Collection (2022).

In comics
The Life is Strange comic series follows Max and Chloe in the timeline where Max chooses to save Chloe and sacrifice Arcadia Bay. Max and Chloe are living in Seattle and befriend a band for whom Chloe does artwork. Max and Chloe find themselves returning to Arcadia Bay after it becomes apparent that Max can no longer control her time powers. The two return to Arcadia Bay and Max realizes that she is drifting in and out of different realities, a phenomenon that she refers to as “flickers.” After a conversation with Chloe about their romantic feelings towards each other and multiple experiences in different realities, Max decides to fully jump into a different timeline and abandon her original one in order to stop the chaos of the flickers. Doing so puts her in a timeline where Rachel Amber is still alive and in a relationship with Chloe. 

Max then lives in that timeline for years and becomes close with Rachel and Chloe, who are unaware of her time traveling capabilities. Eventually, Max meets Tristan, a man who possesses the ability to become invisible. This prompts her to begin to make efforts to return to her original timeline with Tristan's help after revealing to Chloe and Rachel the truth about who she is. Tristan is able to jump to Max's original timeline and communicate with Chloe there that Max is attempting to return. Max then accompanies Rachel and the Chloe in her current timeline on a cross country road trip that coincides with a cross country road trip the Chloe in her original timeline is taking. Through Tristan, Max and her original Chloe are able to communicate with each other and Max begins to prepare herself to make the jump back to her original timeline. In Miami, Max is able to go back into her own timeline with the help of Tristan, who also comes into Max's timeline. Max and Chloe then return to a rebuilding Arcadia Bay, where she discovers Chloe has rebuilt the Two Whales. With Max coming to terms with the tragedy and loss caused by the storm, she is able to speak at Victoria's memorial exhibition, honoring the resilience of the town.

Reception 
Life Is Strange reached both commercial and critical success and was highly praised for its character development in particular. For their work with Max Caulfield, Dontnod received an award nomination from the Academy of Interactive Arts & Sciences for Outstanding Achievement in Character at the 2016 D.I.C.E. Awards. In 2018, IGN published an article by Seamus Mullins where he lauded Max as the most complex video game protagonist he has ever experienced. Max was ranked by PC Gamer staff as among the most iconic characters in PC gaming. Peter Paras of Game Revolution complimented Max's character beats, who he said "really comes into her own as [a] fully-formed character." Metro commented that Max Caulfield has it all, claiming that "She's witty, intelligent and her outlook on life is perfectly characterised via her music taste." Game Informer ranked Max among the best female characters from the year 2015,  with Elise Favis calling Max a "rarity, and not only because she’s a teenage female lead."

Along with Chloe Price, Polygon staff named Max as one of the best video game characters of the 2010s. Though Chloe is often considered the more pivotal character for the story arc, there is interest in seeing more of Max's story.

Some critics have argued that Max's character and development felt generic and inauthentic, perhaps because she is a female character created by male writers. Jean-Maxine Moris, a creative lead in Life is Strange, argued against this criticism by stating  that extensive research was done before creating the characters in the game and that it is backed by Square Enix because it was the only publishing partner that did not try and change critical aspects of the game such as the gender of the main characters.

Further reading

References 

Female characters in video games
Fictional American people in video games
Fictional characters from Oregon
Fictional characters from Seattle
Fictional characters who can manipulate time
Fictional characters with precognition
Fictional photographers
Fictional bisexual females
LGBT characters in video games
Life Is Strange
Square Enix protagonists
Teenage characters in video games
Time travelers
Video game characters introduced in 2015
Video game protagonists
Wikipedia Student Program